"The Last Ride" is a song by Indian singer Sidhu Moose Wala. It was self-released as a single on 15 May 2022. The song was produced by Wazir Patar, and written by Moose Wala.

Lyrical content
Moose Wala admired Tupac Shakur and Nipsey Hussle from the beginning of his career, and in many of his songs he pays homage to the artists. On "The Last Ride", Sidhu describes how the artists lost their lives at young ages: "ਚੋੱਬਰ ਦੇ ਚਿਹਰੇ ਉੱਤੇ ਨੂਰ ਦੱਸਦਾ, ਨੀ ਇਹਦਾ ਉੱਠੂਗਾ ਜਵਾਨੀ 'ਚ ਜਨਾਜ਼ਾਂ ਮਿੱਠੀਏ" (Gurumukhi)/ "چوبر دے چہرے اتے نور دسدا، نی ایہدا اٹھوگا جوانی 'چ جنازاں مٹھیئے" (Shahmukhi) ("Everything is revealed in the eyes of the young boy that the funeral will take place in its youth"). He also discusses how their legacies lives in the hearts of their fans, adding more about his own personal life and the negative reception he received after some of his previous songs.

Following Moose Wala's own death on 29 May 2022, the song received attention for the belief that he had predicted his own death; Moose Wala was similarly shot dead just like Shakur and Hussle.

Commercial performance
After Sidhu Moose Wala was murdered at the age of 28, "The Last Ride" debuted at number 113 on the US Billboard Global Excl.US based on 12 million streams in the week ending June 7, 2022. It became Sidhu's first solo song to be debuted on Global Billboard Charts.

In India, "The Last Ride" debuted at number 1 on the Billboard India Songs chart dated June 7, 2022.

Cover art
The cover of the single depicts the murder scene of Tupac Shakur.

Music video
The music video of the song was also released on 15 May 2022. It was directed by Gurjant Panesar. As of June 2022, the music video has been viewed over 100 million times on YouTube.

Charts

References

2022 singles
2022 songs
Sidhu Moose Wala songs